Flaxton is a rural locality in the Sunshine Coast Region, Queensland, Australia.

History
The locality is named after Flaxton Hall Farm in the fens of Eastern England.  Joseph Dixon, who originally grew sugarcane at Buderim, selected land at Flaxton in 1882.  From 1892 the land was cleared so bananas and citrus fruit could be farmed.

A fruit-packing shed which could process the district's entire harvest was opened 1931.  A sawmill operated for more than 20 years before being burned down in 1956.

Flaxton Provisional School No 1742 opened in February 1922, closing in 1967.

See also
Blackall Range road network

References

External links

 

Suburbs of the Sunshine Coast Region
Localities in Queensland